Qazaqstan is the Kazakhstani state television broadcaster. It started broadcasting on March 8, 1958. It is a part of the Qazaqstan Radio and Television Corporation. The station broadcasts around the clock in the Kazakh language.

The TV channel is broadcasting from Astana (from December 1, 2012, broadcasts have been moved into a new media center QazMedia Ortalygy in Astana) and Alma-Ata and has a regional network of branches in all regions of Kazakhstan. Its program schedule consists of information, educational programs, films and TV series in the Kazakh language. In the regions, the channel has different names (Kazakhstan Taraz, Kazakhstan – Friendly, etc. ), as local broadcast network affiliates controlled by Qazaqstan Radio and Television Corporation.

Qazaqstan TV is also available in homes throughout Russia, Kyrgyzstan, Uzbekistan, Mongolia and China.

History

The first national television channel in Kazakhstan aired for the first time in 1958. At the time broadcasting was limited to five hours a day. By 1987 Kazakhstan was ranked fourth among all Soviet republics by the amount of broadcasting, and second by the number of feature films and documentaries produced.

Qazaqstan TV used to operate two national channels: Kazakhstan-1 (since 2017, Qazaqstan) and Kazakhstan-2. The latter channel was later renamed Alatau in 1992 before being replaced by Khabar TV in 1995.

Since September 2011 the channel broadcasts exclusively in Kazakh language. Prior to that both Kazakh and Russian languages were used.

In December 2021, Qazaqstan TV presented several new historical TV series in honor of the 30th anniversary of the independence of Kazakhstan. These series include: Zhangir khan. Saray syry, Akhmet. Ult Ustazy, Domalaq Ana, Tashenev. Taitalas, Kanysh. Kazyna 
and Mukagali. Bul gassyrdan emespin

Broadcasts 

 Tungі studijada Nurlan Qojanbaevpen
 Aqparat
 Halyq tandauy
 Tansholpan
 Zhajdarman
 Rijasyz angіme
 Orleu. Astana
 Ozekzhardy
 Orleu. Zhana Qazaqstan
 Zhanalyqtar
 Apta.kz
 Arnajy reportazh
 Enselі Elorda
 Qylmys pen zhaza
 Syr suhbat
 Zhan zhyluy
 Kokpar
 Tolagaj
 Sport.kz
 Aq sauyt
 Alan
 Sonbes saule
 Kesh zharyq
 Ajgolek
 Soz mergen
 Iman ajnasy
 Zhuzden zhujrіk
 Damu
 Daua
 Altyn taga
 Andapta
 Ajtuga onaj

Regional channels

Kókshe 
Akmola regional branch of "Kazakhstan" RTRC was founded on September 21, 1999, after the transfer of the administrative center of Astana Akmola region Kokshetau. The TV channel aired for the first time on October 4, 1999.

Some of the popular broadcasts include «Tanymal», «Myñ bır söz» Natal’i Dement’evoi, «Sağynyş» Gakku Asylbekkyzy, «Mektep TV» Dany Abdrahmanovoi i Korganbeka Konysbaiuly, «Toçka zreniia» i «Vopreki vsemu» Razy Mantaevoi, «Qoğam jäne dın» Serika Jetpiskalieva, «Press Room» Aynagwl’ Temirzanovoy, «Jigerı jasymağandar» Makpal Aybabïnoy.

Aqtóbe 
Aktobe regional branch of Qazaqstan Radio and Television Corporation started broadcasting on October 28, 1960. The TV channel broadcasts in the city of Aktobe, as well as in nearby settlements within  from the city. Broadcasts are aired 14 hours a day.

Atyraý 
Atyrau regional branch of RTRC "Kazakhstan"broadcasts in the city of Atyrau, as well as in nearby settlements. Total weekly broadcast time is 119 hours. It includes 80 hours of broadcasts in Kazakh language, which is 68% of the total broadcasting. Original broadcasts account for 45 hours a week, or 38% of total broadcasting.

Altaı 
Osekemen regional branch of RTRC "Kazakhstan" started broadcasting on March 16, 1958. The first broadcast was called "Salyut Pobedy" (Russian: Салют Победы). Starting from 1959 the TV channel started producing original movies and series. Some of the more successful movies include: "Na medvyedya" (Russian: На медведя) – awarded at the Monte -Karl International Film Festival;«Ozero studenoe i laskovoe», «Starik i ozero», «Postiženie».

Jambyl 
Zhambyl regional branch of RTRC "Kazakhstan" broadcasts in the city of Zhambyl, as well as in nearby settlements. During the Soviet era broadcasts were limited to an hour per week. After the USSR collapsed the broadcast time increased. Today total weekly broadcast time is 98 hours. The channel produces about 30 original shows and broadcasts.

Aqjaıyq 
The first transmission of West Kazakhstan regional branch aired September 26, 1964. First broadcasts were limited to three to four hours a day. The channel transferred to digital format in 2003. Total weekly broadcast time today is 98 hours. Some of the popular original broadcasts are «El aldynda», «Vremya vašego voprosa», «Barekeldі, «Arnaiy reportaž», Drugoй Uralьsk» «Ženskie sekretы».

Saryarqa 
Karaganda regional branch of RTRC "Kazakhstan" started broadcasting on August 31, 1958. TV channel is also producing original movies and series. Some of the more successful original broadcasts include: the movie "Arqanın merwert aynası" (Kazakh: Арқаның меруерт айнасы) – awarded at the Shelkovyi put international film festival, documentaries "Kök adırda köp belgi kupïyalı" (Kazakh: Көк адырда көп белгі кұпиялы) and "Ulıtawdın uları žoq" (Kazakh: Ұлытаудың ұлары жоқ).

Qostanaı 
The first transmission of Kostanay regional branch aired February 1, 1991. Chairmans N.Islyamiev, B.Nurmuhanbetov, chief engineer V.Astashov, editor in chief A.Madin are regarded as founders of the branch.

Qyzylorda 
Kyzylorda regional branch of "Kazakhstan" RTRC was founded in 1991. First test broadcast was aired April 30, 1991. The next day first live broadcast was aired. Zhaksylyk Bekhodzhaev was the first executive of the branch. During the first 10 years broadcasts were limited to 10 hours a day. As of 2014 broadcasting time increased to 14 hours per day.

Mańǵystaý 
Aqtau regional branch celebrated its 40th anniversary August 15, 2010. The staff of the TV channel consists of about 100 employees. Broadcasts are limited to 14 hours a day. The estimated audience is 500 000 viewers. The TV channel produces 29 original broadcasts.

Ertis 
Pavlodar regional branch of RTRC "Kazakhstan" started broadcasting on November 7, 1965. Until 1966, the TV channel only broadcast for a limited time, twice a week. In 1979, the TV channel started partly broadcasting in color.

Qyzyljar 
The first transmission of West Kazakhstan regional branch aired in June 1960. In 1967 the first original movie "Gorkaya linia" (Russian: Горькая линия) was filmed and aired. In 1982 the TV channel started partly broadcasting in color. Today Kazakhstan-Petropavl broadcasts 17 hours a day.

Semeı 
Semey regional branch of "Kazakhstan" RTRC was founded in 1965. On September 1 of the same year, the first broadcast was aired in Semey. At the time it was only the 4th regional branch of "Kazakhstan" RTRC in the country. The first head of the Committee for Television and Radio in Semipalatinsk were war veterans Kilchikbay Bayguzhin and Serjan Ramazanov. Today the popular broadcasts of the TV channel include:  «Qayirlu tan»,«Shakarim tagylymy», «Prityazhenie», «Vershina».

Ońtústik 
Shymkent regional branch of "Kazakhstan" RTRC was founded in 1990. On October 5 of the same year, local news was aired for the first time. Today broadcasting time of Kazakhstan-Shymkent is limited to 14 hours a day.

References

External links

 Официальный сайт РТРК «Казахстан»

Kazakh language
Television stations in Kazakhstan
Television channels and stations established in 1958
1958 establishments in the Soviet Union